The UNIAN or Ukrainian Independent Information Agency of News is a Kyiv-based Ukrainian news agency. It produces and provides political, business and financial information, and a photo reporting service.

UNIAN is a part of 1+1 Media Group, related to oligarch Ihor Kolomoyskyi.
UNIAN was founded in March 1993 as the Ukrainian Independent Information Agency of News.

The agency's offices are at 4 Khreshchatyk Street, adjacent to European Square, in Kyiv. UNIAN offers its press conference hall to interested customers.

UNIAN runs a TV channel, UNIAN TV, broadcasting news, analytical programs, documentaries, sport and movies. It is available on satellite, cable and IPTV networks. It broadcasts unencrypted from the AMOS-2 satellite (4.0 W), at 10722 Horizonal, 27500. The channel's General Producer is Vladyslav Svinchenko.

On August 28, 2013, Oksana Romanyuk, executive director of the Institute of Mass Information, wrote on her Facebook page that the UNIAN leadership locked in a room "unpleasant" editors who had previously declared censorship, and several other employees, and kept them for several hours. They were forced to sign that they were aware of the order to "move" them from the site department to the "TV news monitoring" department located somewhere in Darnytsia." Journalists called it revenge for the fact that they had previously reported on censorship: "We consider the decision of the administration as aimed at persecuting critics and citizens, as well as establishing total censorship on the UNIAN website."

Notable people
 Iryna Herashchenko, a president of UNIAN in 2006–07

References

External links

 
Ukrainian brands
Mass media in Kyiv
1993 establishments in Ukraine
Television stations in Ukraine
Ukrainian-language television stations
Ukrainian-language television stations in Ukraine
News agencies based in Ukraine
Ukrainian news websites
1+1 Media Group